Karl Friedrich Heinrich Band (8 November 1900 – 6 October 1995) was a German architect.

Origin 
Born in Cologne, Band was the son of the architect Heinrich Band (1855–1919), a long-time associate of the building councillor Hermann Otto Pflaume, whose office he also headed for a time. He was also related to the painter Michael Welter (1808–1892), who, among other things, painted the Cologne parish church Basilica of St. Cunibert, Cologne after the tower was rebuilt in the 19th century, and with Heinrich Band, the inventor of the bandoneon, a brother of his grandfather.

Band was married to Annegret Band-Löffler and had children Michaela and Gero († 1983) with her, who was his junior partner from 1965. In 1988, he married Gertrud Band-Neyses.

Professional career 
Since 1919 he was a member of the Catholic student fraternity . After his studies, he worked in various studios in Cologne, such as Hans Schumacher (1925–1927), Heinrich Renard and Eugen Fabricius, before opening his own office in 1928. In September 1929 Band became an employee of the church architect Eduard Endler, and from December 1930 he was his partner. In the same year he also passed the second state examination with subsequent appointment as government master builder. According to an agreement, after Endler's death (1932), his son Clemens joined the studio as a partner (Band und Endler firm); however, Endler did not continue this partnership after the war and his imprisonment.

Conscripted into military service, Band was commissioned in the early 1940s to plan and build accommodation for the V 1 production in Peenemünde-West and other work. As far as he was able, he and like-minded people tried to save the substance of the war-damaged Förderverein Romanische Kirchen Köln. Shortly after the end of the war, he was commissioned by the occupying powers to draw up expert reports on the condition of the church monuments.

In 1950/1951, Band built his private house next to the church of Basilica of St. Cunibert, Cologne. Until 1965 and again from 1983, after the death of his son Gero, Karl Band ran the studio alone, from which the designs for approximately 140 completed commercial buildings, 100 residential and commercial buildings and over 100 churches as well as church renovations and reconstructions emerged.

Aftermath 
Band died on 6 October 1995 at the age of 94 and was buried in the Melaten Cemetery (Lit.C, between Lit.V and Lit.W).

Band belonged to a circle of artists and architects also titled "", which included Rudolf Schwarz, Dominikus Böhm and Gottfried Böhm, Josef Bernard and his former student .

Since 2007, Band's estate has been processed in the Historical Archive of the City of Cologne to enable its later use for scientific purposes.

In 2014, the green space between Konrad-Adenauer-Ufer and Kunibertsgasse – near his house – was named Karl-Band-Platz.

Work

Buildings

Cologne 

 1929: Mitwirkung bei dem Umbau des Rheinlandhauses in Deutz
 1938–1940: Pfarrkirche St. Norbert in Dellbrück
 from 1943 (after 1945): Reconstruction of the building of the St. Marien-Hospital
 after 1945: Reconstruction of the Deutz Abbey in Cologne
 1945–1955/1968: Wiederaufbau der Kirche Basilica of St. Cunibert, Cologne
 1950: Laden- und Ausstellungsgebäude für das Möbelhaus Gustav Schirmer, Cäcilienstr. 25 (2007 abgebrochen)
 1950–1951: Wohn- und Geschäftshaus Markmannsgasse 3–5 (collaboration with Hans Schilling)
 1950–1951: Wohnhaus und Atelier Band, Kunibertsklostergasse 1 (früher 3)
 1951: Geschäftshaus Hohenzollernring 14
 1951–1952 Kath. Pfarrkirche "St. Elisabeth" in Mülheim
 1951–1954 Kath. Pfarrkirche "St. Dreifaltigkeit" in Poll
 1952–1955: Wiederaufbau des  (together with Rudolf Schwarz)
 1952/1953–1967 Wiederaufbau der Kirche 
 1953–1955: neue Krypta und Grabkapelle für den Heiligen Albertus Magnus in the St. Andrew's Church, Cologne church
 1953–1957: Anbau für Bibliothek und Verwaltung des Museum Schnütgen und Wiederaufbau der Kirche St. Cäcilien, Cäcilienstraße 29
 1954–1958: Humboldt-Gymnasium, Karthäuserwall 40
 1954: Dompropstei, Margarethenkloster 5
 1955: Pfarrhaus der Kirche St. Kunibert, Kunibertsklostergasse 2
 1956: „Haus der Begegnung“ des katholischen Männerwerks, Jabachstraße 4–8
 1956–1957: Wohn- und Geschäftshaus des Wilhelm Wefers „Paramente Wefers“, Komödienstr. 97–103 / Burgmauer 60
 1956–1957: Expansion of the church and construction of the new rectory "Zum Heiligen Geist" in Zollstock
 1957: Rectory of St. Andrew
 1960–1972: Reconstruction of the Cologne City Hall (with Eugen Weiler, 1961 competition, Einweihung 1972)
 1961–1963: Reconstruction of the parish church St. Johann Baptist
 1962–1964: New construction of the parish church St. Clemens in Niehl

Outside Cologne 

 1932: Erweiterung der Kapelle St. Mariä Himmelfahrt in 
1936/1937: Umbau der St.-Nikolaus-Kirche in Wipperfürth
 1936/1937: St. Brictius in Stotzheim
 ca. 1942: Planung und Ausführung von Belegschaftsunterkünften für die V1-Fabrik in Peenemünde
1953–1955: Reconstruction of St. Peter in Zülpich
 1956: Umbau der Kirche St. Johann Baptist in (Hürth-)Kendenich
 1957: Erweiterung und Umbau der Kirche St. Severin Frechen Chronik des Frechener Geschichtsvereins (PDF-Dokument)
 June 1959–1960: Gelsenkirchen-Hassel, St. Theresia
 1960–1962: Bonn, Nordstadt, katholische Pfarrkirche St. Franziskus (with Werner Fritzen)
 1963: Erweiterung der Kirche St. Johann Baptist in Refrath
 1966–1968: Kirchenerweiterung St. Severin, Hürth-Hermülheim
 1969: Erweiterung der romanischen Kirche St. Clemens (Drolshagen) durch einen Anbau an der Südseite.
1969–1970: St. Johannes der Evangelist (Köln-Stammheim) (with Gero Band)
 1970–1971: Umbau und Erweiterung der Kirche St. Mariä Geburt in Hürth-Efferen
 1971–1973 mit Sohn Gero (Oktober 71 Grundsteinlegung) Sebastianusstift, Altenwohnheim der St.-Dionysius-Gemeinde in Gleuel (jetzt Caritas)
 1975: Bad Honnef, Ortsteil Rhöndorf, Museumsgebäude der Stiftung Bundeskanzler-Adenauer-Haus

Competitions 
 1925–1926: Kath. Kirche in Bickendorf
 1935: "Altstadtsanierung Köln" (Martinsviertel), Erster Preis

References

Further reading 
 Wolfram Hagspiel: Köln. Marienburg Stadtspuren, Denkmäler in Köln 2. J. P. Bachem, Cologne 1996. , pp. 790f., pp. 823f.
 Birgit Kastner: Die Sakralbauten des Kölner Architekten Karl Band (1900–1995) Arbeitsheft der rheinischen Denkmalpflege 80. , Worms 2013.  Dissertation, Rheinische Friedrich-Wilhelms-Universität Bonn Bonn, 2012.
 Arno M. Lennartz: Der Architekt Eduard Endler 1860–1932. Dissertation, RWTH Aachen, 1984.
 Hans Schilling: Hans Schilling Architektur 1945–2000. Walter König, Köln 2001.

External links 

 Gudrun Escher: Karl Band (1900–1995) – Der Wiederaufbau Kölns Bei Architektenkammer NRW

20th-century German architects
Cartellverband members
1900 births
1995 deaths
Architects from Cologne